Gmina Drzewica is an urban-rural gmina (administrative district) in Opoczno County, Łódź Voivodeship, in central Poland.

Villages
Apart from the town of Drzewica, Gmina Drzewica contains the villages and settlements of Augustów, Brzustowiec, Brzuza, Dąbrówka, Domaszno, Giełzów, Idzikowice, Jelnia, Krzczonów, Radzice Duże, Radzice Małe, Strzyżów, Świerczyna, Trzebina, Werówka, Zakościele, Żardki and Żdżary.

Neighbouring gminas
Gmina Drzewica is bordered by the gminas of Gielniów, Odrzywół, Opoczno, Poświętne and Rusinów.

References
Polish official population figures 2006

Drzewica
Opoczno County